Scaevola ramosissima, commonly known as the purple fan-flower or  snake flower is a flowering plant in the family Goodeniaceae and is endemic to south eastern Australia. It has wiry, horizontal branches and purple fan-shaped flowers.

Description

Taxonomy and naming
Scaevola ramosissima was first formally described in 1912 by Kurt Krause and the description was published in Das Pflanzenreich. The specific epithet (ramosissima) means "much branched".

Distribution and habitat
Purple fan-flower grows usually in sandy or gravelly soils in sclerophyll forests and heath from the Blackdown Tableland in Queensland, through  New South Wales east of the Blue Mountains and Budawang Range, and in Victoria areas south of the ranges and east of Morwell.

References

ramosissima
Flora of New South Wales
Flora of Victoria (Australia)
Flora of Queensland
Asterales of Australia